A sovnya is a traditional polearm used in Russia. Similar to the glaive, the sovnya had a curved, single-edged blade mounted on the end of a long pole. This was a weapon used by late-medieval Muscovite cavalry and 
it retained use until the mid-17th century.

Gallery

See also 
 Timeline of Russian innovation

References

Polearms
Blade weapons
Russian inventions
Medieval polearms